Bochart is a French surname. Notable people with the surname include:

Matthieu Bochart (before 19 March 1619–1662), French Protestant minister at Alençon
Samuel Bochart  (1599–1667), French Protestant biblical scholar

French-language surnames